Hameeda Waheeduddin (Punjabi, ; born 4 January 1976) is a Japanese-Pakistani politician who was a Member of the Provincial Assembly of the Punjab from August 2018 till January 2023. Previously, she had served in the provincial assembly of the province of Punjab, Pakistan from 2002 to 2007, May 2013 to May 2018.

Early life and education
She was born on 4 January 1976 to a Japanese mother and Pakistani father. According to Embassy of Japan in Pakistan, her Japanese name is Hanako Sumida and she was born in Osaka, Japan; however, according to the Provincial Assembly of the Punjab, she was born in Mandi Bahauddin, Punjab, Pakistan.

She received her early education from Japan. After relocating to Pakistan she learnt Urdu language for 6 months and completed matriculation education in Urdu. She received the degree of Bachelor of Science in 1998 from Lahore College for Women University.

Political career

She was elected to the Provincial Assembly of the Punjab as a candidate of Pakistan Muslim League (Q) (PML-Q) from Constituency PP-116 (Mandi Bahauddin-I) in 2002 Pakistani general election. She received 33,122 votes and defeated Safia Begum, a candidate of Pakistan Muslim League (N) (PML-N). During her tenure as Member of the Punjab Assembly, she served as Parliamentary Secretary for Literacy and Non- formal Basic Education from 2003 to 2007.

She ran for the seat of the Provincial Assembly of the Punjab as a candidate of PML-Q from Constituency PP-116 (Mandi Bahauddin-I) in 2008 Pakistani general election but was unsuccessful. She received 19,638 votes and lost the seat to Tariq Mehmood Sahi, a candidate of Pakistan Peoples Party (PPP).

She was re-elected to the Provincial Assembly of the Punjab as a candidate of PML-N from Constituency PP-116 (Mandi Bahauddin-I) in 2013 Pakistani general election. She received 52,826 votes and defeated Dewan Mushtaq Ahmed. In June 2013, she was inducted into the provincial cabinet of Chief Minister Shehbaz Sharif and was made Provincial Minister of Punjab for Women Development.

She was re-elected to Provincial Assembly of the Punjab as a candidate of PML-N from Constituency PP-65 (Mandi Bahauddin-I) in 2018 Pakistani general election.

References

Living people
Pakistani politicians of Japanese descent
Punjab MPAs 2013–2018
Women members of the Provincial Assembly of the Punjab
Punjab MPAs 2002–2007
1976 births
Pakistan Muslim League (N) MPAs (Punjab)
Pakistan Muslim League (Q) MPAs (Punjab)
Punjab MPAs 2018–2023
Punjabi people
Women provincial ministers of Punjab
Lahore College for Women University alumni
21st-century Pakistani women politicians
Pakistani expatriates in Japan